Scott Lloyd Benton (born 1 July 1987) is a British politician who has served as the Member of Parliament (MP) for Blackpool South since 2019. A member of the Conservative Party, he was previously a councillor on Calderdale Metropolitan Borough Council.

Early life and education 
Benton was born in Newport, Wales, to Alan and Krystina Benton. He grew up in Rastrick, West Yorkshire, and attended Rastrick High School.

He studied theology as an undergraduate at the University of Nottingham and was awarded a first Bachelor of Arts degree and also later completed a Master of Arts degree in the subject. After graduating, Benton worked as a primary school teacher.

Political career 
In 2011, Benton was elected to Calderdale Metropolitan Borough Council for the Brighouse ward, centred on the area of that name. As a councillor he spent periods of time as Deputy Leader of the Council and then Leader of the Conservative Group.

Alongside being a councillor, Benton worked as a Parliamentary assistant for Craig Whittaker, the Conservative MP for Calder Valley.

Benton previously ran for Strangford at the 2017 Northern Ireland Assembly election and Huddersfield, a safe seat for the Labour Party, at the 2017 general election.

Benton contested and won Blackpool South at the 2019 general election. His win marked the first time since 1997 that the constituency has been represented by a Conservative. He achieved a swing of 9.4%, and was elected with a majority of 3,690 votes. His campaign focused on delivering Brexit, reopening Blackpool Airport for commercial flights and opposing the plans for development on Stanley Park Golf Course.

During the 2019 election campaign, David Brown, who stood for the Brexit Party against Benton, expressed concerns over his links to the anti-abortion organisation Society for the Protection of Unborn Children (SPUC), which has campaigned against same-sex marriage and been accused of homophobia. In response, Benton stated that he was no longer linked to the SPUC. He said that he supported their anti-abortion stance but was not homophobic and was a supporter of same-sex marriage.

Following an interim report on the connections between colonialism and properties now in the care of the National Trust, including links with historic slavery, Benton was among the signatories of a letter to The Telegraph in November 2020 from the Common Sense Group of Conservative Parliamentarians. The letter accused the National Trust of being "coloured by cultural Marxist dogma".

In July 2021, it was reported by The Guardian that Benton was one of nine MPs from different political parties who had accepted tickets to high-profile sporting events as hospitality from betting and gambling companies. He received tickets to Royal Ascot, two Euro 2020 football games and Wimbledon.

On 13 June 2022, Benton was appointed Parliamentary Private Secretary to the Foreign, Commonwealth and Development Office ministerial team.

In June 2022, following the Dobbs v. Jackson Women's Health Organization decision of the US Supreme Court – which reversed the 1973 Roe v. Wade legislation which had previously granted the right to abortion in the United States — Benton retweeted a tweet by the US Republican Party celebrating the decision. Benton subsequently deleted the retweet.

Political views 
In December 2021, Benton voiced his support of the death penalty in certain scenarios.

Benton is anti-abortion.

Breach of parliamentary rules 
In January 2021, Benton was found to have broken Parliamentary rules. The complainant alleged Benton had failed to register six entries in the Register of Members' Financial Interests within the House's 28-day deadline, for payments received for his work as a Members' researcher.

When asked about the allegations in November 2020, Benton had said that "an admin error" meant his income from Calderdale Council had not been properly declared. Benton had said there had been "vexatious and deeply unpleasant" complaints about his conduct. He said: "I have no doubt that the complaints... made about me to Calderdale Council and the Parliamentary authorities will be found to be without substance."

The Parliamentary commissioner for standards found that in failing to register his various interests within the specified time frame, he had breached the rules. After the complaint was upheld, Benton said: "I would like to take this opportunity to acknowledge my mistake and apologise once again for inadvertently breaching the rules."

Personal life 
Benton married his partner Harry Symonds in November 2021 in the Palace of Westminster.

References

External links

1987 births
Living people
UK MPs 2019–present
Place of birth missing (living people)
Conservative Party (UK) MPs for English constituencies
21st-century English politicians
English LGBT politicians
LGBT members of the Parliament of the United Kingdom
Gay politicians